Steingrímur Hermannsson (pronounced ; 22 June 1928 – 1 February 2010) was an Icelandic politician who served as prime minister of Iceland from 1983 to 1987, and again from 1988 to 1991.

Early childhood

Steingrímur's father was Hermann Jónasson, another former Prime Minister. Being the son of a prominent official, Steingrímur enjoyed a relatively care-free upbringing in a country stricken by the Great Depression. As a young boy he had an exceptional proximity to Iceland's World War II politics, overhearing state affairs being discussed in his father's living room.

Education

Not wanting to follow his father's footsteps into politics, Steingrímur went to the U.S. in 1948. He received a bachelor's degree in electrical engineering from Illinois Institute of Technology in 1951 and a master's degree from Caltech in 1952. After returning to his native country and experiencing troubles both in his private life and business career, he eventually entered politics in the 1960s. He was elected to the Althing (Icelandic Parliament) for the Progressive Party in 1971. He became party chairman in 1979.

Politics

Steingrímur served as Prime Minister from 1983 to 1987 and again from 1988 to 1991. He also served for a time as Minister of Justice, Ecclesiastical Affairs and Agriculture (1978–79), Minister of Fisheries and Communications (1980–83) and Minister of Foreign Affairs (1987–88). He was chairman of the Progressive Party from 1979 to 1994. After that he was governor of the Central Bank of Iceland until his retirement in 1998.

International affairs

Internationally, his greatest moment as Prime Minister came in 1986, when he hosted the Reykjavík Summit of Soviet General Secretary Mikhail Gorbachev and US President Ronald Reagan. Although not considered a success at the time, the summit paved the way for the ending of the Cold War, and the Icelandic government's management of the event was widely commended. In 1991, during the January Events in Lithuania, Steingrímur expressed strong support for Vytautas Landsbergis, Chairman of Lithuanian Parliament. Shortly after, Iceland was the first country to recognize the independence of Lithuania from Soviet Union.

Steingrímur first kept a low profile in his retirement, rarely voicing his opinion of current affairs. He was however a founding member of Heimssýn, an organization opposed to Iceland's entry of the European Union, and became increasingly critical of the Progressive Party's policies. He gave public support to "The Iceland Movement", an ad hoc environmental movement which ran (unsuccessfully) in the 2007 Althing elections, appearing in campaign advertisements on TV. As a result of these activities, he mostly lost the informal status of the Progressive party's "Grand Old Man".

In his last years Steingrímur was a well liked and respected elder statesman, and was considered as a potential candidate for the 1996 presidential elections. But he quickly declined that honour, stating his intention to retire at the age of 70. His memoirs, published in three volumes in 1998–2000, became bestsellers.

Family

Steingrímur was twice married and had six children. His youngest son, Guðmundur Steingrímsson was active in Icelandic politics between 2007 and 2016. He first ran for the Althing in the 2007 elections, for the Social Democratic Alliance. In early 2009, however, he switched sides and joined his grandfather's and father's Progressive Party and got elected. Then switched again and got elected in 2013 for Bright Future.

His eldest children, John, Ellen, and Neil Hermannsson reside in the United States with their own children, all of whom have been to Iceland.

References

|-

|-

|-

|-

|-

1928 births
2010 deaths
Steingrimur Hermannsson
Steingrimur Hermannsson
California Institute of Technology alumni
Steingrimur Hermannsson
Children of national leaders
Steingrimur Hermannsson
Steingrimur Hermannsson
Steingrimur Hermannsson
Steingrimur Hermannsson
Steingrimur Hermannsson
Governors of the Central Bank of Iceland
Steingrimur Hermannsson